Burroughs is a large crater on Mars at latitude 72.5S / longitude 243.1W, with a diameter of .

The crater is named after Edgar Rice Burroughs, the American science fiction novelist who wrote a series of fantasy novels set on the planet.

An ice deposit in Burroughs Crater contains strong evidence that recent Martian climate is influenced by changes in the planet's orbit and axial tilt.

References

External links
 The crater Burroughs on Barsoom

Impact craters on Mars
Edgar Rice Burroughs
Mare Australe quadrangle